Prototheora merga is a species of moth of the family Prototheoridae. It is found in South Africa, where it is only known from the Schoemanspoort in the Cape Province.

The wingspan is about 18 mm. The only known adult was collected in mid-March.

References

Endemic moths of South Africa
Hepialoidea
Moths of Africa
Moths described in 1996
Taxa named by Donald R. Davis (entomologist)